Shaheed Bhagat Singh State University, formerly known as Shaheed Bhagat Singh State Technical Campus and Shaheed Bhagat Singh College of Engineering and Technology, is a state university in Ferozepur, Punjab. It was established by Punjab Government in the year 1995. The institute is fully promoted by the Punjab Government and is registered as a Society under the Societies Registration Act 1860. In 2021 it got University status and name of Shaheed Bhagat Singh State University by Punjab act no. 10 of 2021.

Affiliation
The university is AICTE approved, Academically Autonomous under UGC act and was affiliated to I. K. Gujral Punjab Technical University, Jalandhar and follows semester system of education. Each academic year is divided into two semester- July/August to December and January to June/July. University examinations are held at the end of each semester.

Departments

Faculty members of various departments

Courses Offered

B.Tech
All the courses of Engineering are of four years duration (eight semesters). 

 5% additional seats for admission in 1st year for Fee-Waiver Scheme and 
 20% additional seats for direct admission to 2nd year for diploma holder students through lateral entry scheme.

Diploma
All the courses of Diploma are of three years duration (six semesters).

M. Tech (Regular)
All the courses of M. Tech (Regular) are of two years duration (four semesters).

Management

Computer Applications
All these courses are of three years duration (six semesters).

PTU Regional Center for Part-Time M.Tech
All the courses of M. Tech (Part-Time) are of three years duration (six semesters).

References 

Engineering colleges in Punjab, India
Universities in Punjab, India
Memorials to Bhagat Singh
1995 establishments in Punjab, India
Educational institutions established in 1995